Zhuozhou, is a county-level city with 628,000 inhabitants in Hebei province, bordering Beijing to the north. It is administered by Baoding prefecture-level city. Zhuozhou has 3 subdistricts, 6 towns, 5 townships, and 1 development zone.

Administrative divisions
Subdistricts:
Shuangta Subdistrict, Taoyuan Subdistrict, Qingliangsi Subdistrict

Towns:
Songlindian, Matou, Dongchengfang, Gaoguanzhuang, Dongxianpo, Baichigan

Townships:
Yihezhuang Township, Lintun Township, Sunzhuang Township, Douzhuang Township, Diaowo Township

Climate

Transportation

Railroads
 Beijing–Guangzhou Railway: Zhuozhou Railway Station
 Beijing–Shijiazhuang High-Speed Railway: Zhuozhou East Railway Station

Highways
 G4 Beijing–Hong Kong and Macau Expressway
 China National Highway 107
 G95 Capital Region Ring Expressway

Places of interest
 Zhidu Temple Pagoda: A pagoda built in the Liao Dynasty.

References

External links 
 Zhuozhou City Government Website
 Pagoda at Yunju Temple in Zhuozhou of Hebei Province

 
Geography of Baoding
County-level cities in Hebei